KLUV (98.7 FM, "98.7 K-LUV") is a commercial radio station licensed to Dallas, Texas, and serving the Dallas/Fort Worth Metroplex. KLUV is owned by Audacy, Inc., and airs a classic hits radio format.

KLUV's studios and offices are located off North Central Expressway at North Fitzhugh Avenue in Dallas.  The transmitter site is in Cedar Hill off West Belt Line Road, amid the towers for other Dallas-area FM and TV stations.  KLUV broadcasts in the HD Radio hybrid format; a simulcast of sister station KRLD is heard on the station's HD2 sub-channel. The HD3 sub-channel formerly aired a classic album-oriented rock (AOR) format known as "KLUV Classic Trax", but has since been turned off.

The K-LUV name on 98.7 was a holdover from an adult contemporary music format from the early 1980s. Even though the moniker is pronounced K-Love, the station's name pre-dates the national K-Love Radio Network, which carries a Contemporary Christian format. To avoid confusion, that network is not heard in Dallas-Fort Worth.

History

KROW and KLIF-FM
In 1959, when the station was not yet on the air, it was given the call sign KOST, but that was never used. The station was then rebranded KROW and signed on in 1961 as a Top 40 station under the ownership of noted radio programmer Gordon McLendon. Two years later, the call sign changed to KLIF-FM as a simulcast of McLendon-owned AM 1190 KLIF (now KFXR).

KNUS
In July 1966, the station changed its call letters to KNUS and began an automated progressive rock/underground rock format, with live disc jockeys added in mid-1967. (McLendon had originally planned to provide an all-news format on the station, hence the NUS (pronounced like "news") call letters, but that never took place.) When McLendon sold his AM Top 40 flagship station KLIF to Fairchild Industries in 1972, he offered the company KNUS as well, but Fairchild declined. As part of the sale, McLendon agreed not to operate any AM station within a 150-mile radius of Dallas. Since the agreement did not forbid him to operate an FM station, McLendon continued to own and program KNUS.

By 1971, the station had morphed into a rock-based Top 40 station, which played hit music without teen-oriented "bubblegum" songs.  (The station's initial promotion to plug the new Top 40 format had a disc jockey positioned at the top of a flagpole at McLendon's Gemini Drive-In Movie Theatre. The pole had large "KNUS" lettering mounted vertically on each side of the square truss. The pole was still intact in the 1990s, long after the KNUS calls were dropped, and the Gemini had shut down.)

Transition to oldies
KNUS eventually transitioned into a more mainstream Top 40, and it paid off when the station passed KLIF in the ratings in the fall of 1975, becoming one of the first FM Top 40 stations to defeat its chief AM competitor. By the end of the 1970s, however, KNUS had fallen out of the top ten. McLendon sold KNUS to the San Juan Racing Corporation in May 1979, which, in turn, sold the station to John Tenaglia's TK Communications on October 27, 1982. Under Tenaglia's ownership, the station switched to an adult contemporary format as KLVU on October 19, 1981. Initially, the station played hits from 1964 through the 1980s and including then-current product. A handful of pre-'64 oldies were also mixed in. In 1984, after an AM oldies station changed formats, KLVU began adding more pre-1964 oldies in the mix. The music began to lean slightly more uptempo as well. The station morphed into an all-oldies format in 1985, playing pop oldies from the late 1950s, '60s, '70s, and early '80s. The music from the mid to late-1970s and '80s gradually was eliminated in 1986. By then, KLUV was playing only hits from 1955 to 1973.

Owner John Tenaglia purchased the more-coveted "KLUV"-spelled call letters for $10,000 from a Haynesville, Louisiana, station, trading 98.7's former KLVU calls (which were established at 98.7 on October 19, 1981, under the station's San Juan Racing ownership).  By the late 1980s, KLUV evolved into a 1964 to 1969-based oldies format playing a couple pre-1964 songs each hour and one or two early 1970s songs per hour. Tenaglia sold the rebranded KLUV to CBS on April 21, 1995, for a then-staggering $55 million.

The years when Chuck Brinkman was the program director (1988–2006) included many personalities such as Hubcap Carter, Glen Martin (who had also previously been there during the KNUS and KLVU days), Jason Walker, Jonathan Hayes, Jim Brady, Johnny Michaels, Steve Eberhart, Al Forgeson, Paula Street (who in 1987 went to WODS Boston, now KLUV's sister station), Dave Van Dyke, Charlie Van Dyke (the station's imaging voice at the time), Debi Diaz, John Summers, Jim Prewitt, Jay Cresswell, Bob Gomez, Sandi Sharp, Ben Laurie, Bob deCarlo, Roger Manning (who inherited the Saturday Night Oldies Party from Hubcap Carter), Johnny Stone, John McCarty, Tony Moreno, Mike Wade, Brian Pierce, Kate Garvin, and Ken Fine, who was Chief Engineer.

Death of Ricky Nelson
On December 31, 1985, singer Ricky Nelson and his band were flying to KLUV's New Year's Eve sock hop, hosted by Ken "Hubcap" Carter.  The plane crashed near DeKalb, Texas, 136 miles northeast of Dallas, killing Nelson and his entourage.

Transition to classic hits 
In 1997, KLUV, like many oldies stations around the United States, began mixing in (in this case, bringing back) hits of the late 1970s and even a few from the early 1980s. In 1998, the station largely removed most of the 1955 to 1963 songs from its playlist. Another CBS station, KLUV (AM) 1190 (now KFXR) and, coincidentally, the same dial position as former sister station KLIF, existed from 1998 to 2000 and primarily played 1950s music. Meanwhile, the main station continued modifying its format to more of a classic hits format with songs from the mid-1960s to early 1980s. By 2003, KLUV no longer played pre-1964 music, with a few rare exceptions. Most years, on Memorial Day weekend, KLUV featured a "Top 500 Countdown" in which the top 500 oldies, as picked by the station's listeners, were played in descending order for the entire weekend.

In 2002, the station was temporarily the radio home of the Dallas Cowboys football team, featuring live broadcasts of their games. In 2006, Dallas Cowboys broadcasts moved to sports radio station KTCK.

From November 23, 1998, to June 27, 2003, KLUV competed with Disney/ABC Radio's KMEO ("Memories 96.7") and again from June 30, 2008, until March 12, 2010, with Citadel Broadcasting's KPMZ ("Platinum 96.7"). Both stations aired a classic adult contemporary format playing soft hits of the 1960s to the 1980s with a couple of pre-'64 songs per hour.  (Today, 96.7 is sports station KTCK-FM).

KLUV was the first radio station in the United States to report the death of Michael Jackson in July 2009.

In 2005, with the retirement of long-time radio veteran and morning host Ron Chapman, KLUV hired noted Dallas news personality Jody Dean as his replacement. On October 25, 2010, Jody Dean and the Morning Team started simulcasting the show on then co-owned KTXA. In January 2013, Jody Dean and the Morning Team was downsized to just Jody Dean and Rebekah Black, later adding David Rancken. Jody would retire five years later, and was replaced by Jeff Miles and was shortly named Miles in the Morning. Dean later worked at a local service in Dallas.

Dallas-Fort Worth's Christmas station
KLUV's sister station, then-adult contemporary KVIL (103.7 FM), would usually flip to Christmas music from mid-November to the day after Christmas Day for many years until 2013, when the station shifted to a Hot AC format in May that year. Therefore, the Christmas music format moved to KLUV and began on November 15, 2013. For 2014, the Christmas format began on November 13 and ended at midnight on December 29. From 2013 until Christmas night in 2017, KLUV had simulcast its Christmas music on sister TV station KTXA during that station's annual Yule Log special, which runs from the evening of Christmas Eve to Christmas Day.

When the station first began airing all-Christmas, there had been rumors that KLUV would drop its longtime classic hits format on December 26, 2013 to become a Top 40/CHR station as "Amp Radio 98.7". CBS stated that there were no plans to change KLUV's format, with the station remaining classic hits. This format change was highly unlikely anyway, because the CHR format was already being heard on KHKS, KLIF-FM, and later on KVIL, who would rebrand as "AMP 103.7" in January 2017. In November 2016, KDGE (formerly known as alternative "102.1 The Edge") also switched to Christmas music after the station was relaunched as mainstream adult contemporary "Star 102.1". (KVIL itself shifted to alternative a year later.)

Starting in November 2019, KLUV began playing Christmas music on its HD3 sub-channel with a wider playlist than heard previously on KLUV's main signal.  The main channel did not switch to all-Christmas music, continuing its classic hits format through December, but playing some occasional Christmas songs in its regular playlist.

Entercom era 
On February 2, 2017, CBS Radio announced it would merge with Entercom (now known as Audacy, Inc.). The merger was approved on November 9, 2017, and was consummated on November 17.

In early 2017, KLUV added in music from the 1990s by artists such as Sheryl Crow and UB40, while gradually phasing out music from the 1960s.

By 2019, KLUV's slogan changed to "Nobody Plays More 80s," which is also being used on other Audacy-owned classic hits stations such as WOGL in Philadelphia.

Programming 
KLUV is an affiliate of Scott Shannon's America's Greatest Hits, which airs Sundays from 7 a.m. until 11 a.m. The show formerly aired from 8 a.m. to 12 p.m. until 2018, when it was shifted to an hour earlier.

As of 2021, KLUV plays a total of 10 to 25 minutes of advertisements each hour, with both 5 to 12 minutes of commercials from both first and second half-hours at every quarter. The station plays a total of 9 to 11 songs each hour.

Comparing KLUV and KEOM 
Comparing both KLUV and its community competitor KEOM in Mesquite, KLUV airs a more limited power songs playlist and is commercial. As a non-commercial station, KEOM does not utilize a power songs playlist or commercial limit since its competitor is a community ownership station, in which KEOM considered a more enhanced and much larger playlist than KLUV.

KLUV HD channels

HD2
KLUV launched HD Radio operations in 2006, including an HD2 sub-channel. Originally, it was called "The Fab Format", playing The Beatles full time.  In January 2008, the HD signal changed to KLUV's previous oldies format, playing music from the 1950s, 60s and some early 70s.  The station can be received on HD-equipped radios on 98.7-HD2. As of August 2018, it had rebranded as "Smokin' Oldies," still concentrating on the 1950s, 60s and early 70s.

On February 27, 2023, the oldies format on the HD2 subchannel was replaced by a simulcast of KRLD-AM's news format.

HD3
In early May 2016, KLUV launched another digital subchannel on 98.7-HD3, and aired Radio Disney's Top 40 format targeted to children and younger teens.  (Radio Disney was previously heard on KMKI until September 15, 2015.)  Entercom's deal with Radio Disney expired at the end of May 2018. The next month, KLUV-HD3 flipped to a classic AOR-format known as "KLUV Classic Trax," playing deep cuts from the 1970s to the 90s. Starting with the 2019 holiday season, KLUV-HD3 began airing Christmas music from early November through Christmas Day.  The subchannel airs a few public service announcements each hour but has no commercial interruptions. KLUV-HD3 has since been turned off.

KLUV and its HD subchannels can be heard online on the Audacy platform.

References

External links

2006 Top 500 Countdown
 DFW Radio/TV History
 DFW Radio Archives

Radio stations established in 1961
1961 establishments in Texas
Oldies radio stations in the United States
Classic hits radio stations in the United States
LUV
Audacy, Inc. radio stations